The Asian tortoise tick, (Amblyomma clypeolatum) is a hard-bodied tick of the genus Amblyomma. The tick is a parasite of tortoises, such as Geochelone elegans, domestic dogs, buffaloes. It is found in India, Sri Lanka and Myanmar. Adult tick is about 3 cm in length.

References

External links
Detection of Rickettsia and Ehrlichia spp. in Ticks Associated with Exotic Reptiles and Amphibians Imported into Japan

Amblyomma
Animals described in 1899